The Agreement on Journey Continuation (AJC) is a commercial agreement between 15 major European rail operators, to allow international train passengers on the next possible train without additional costs, in case of a missed train connection.

Background 
Before the AJC, there were already other protections for rail passengers who miss a connecting train and lose their seat reservation due to a delay of the first train. These passengers are allowed on the next possible train without additional costs under certain conditions:

 the protection of the CIV (International Convention for the transportation of Passengers) when travelling with a single ticket (through ticket). However in the 21st century for a lot of international train journeys there are no through tickets available, and the passenger has no other choice than to buy separate tickets.
 the HOTNAT (hop on the next available train) protection of the Railteam alliance. when travelling with two separate train tickets. However this protection is valid:
 only between two high speed trains of the 8 participating European operators
 only in specific railway stations (including Brussels-South, Lille Europe, Frankfurt Hbf, Cologne Hbf and the transfer between the major Paris stations)
 only in case of a delay, not a cancellation, of the preceding train.

Since 2017, the AJC provides a further protection when the above protections are not valid. The AJC protection is similar to the protection of CIV, but covers separate tickets instead of a single ticket (through ticket).

Conditions 
The passenger who, due to a delay or cancellation of the preceding train, misses a train on which he has a seat reservation, is allowed on the next possible train without additional costs under these conditions:

 It is an international train journey.
 The operators of the connecting trains have both signed the agreement.
 The passenger must have foreseen a reasonable connecting time between the trains (minimal the proposed time of the official journey planners)
 The passenger must present a confirmation of this delay, that he received from the delayed operator.
 Onward travel has to be on the same operator and the same route as on the ticket
 The AJC is not an automatic passenger right. At the interchange station, the passenger should ask permission from the station staff or from the train manager of the onward train.

Participating rail operators 
The agreement is developed by the International Rail Transport Committee (CIT).

The 15 signatories are:

 BLS (Switzerland)
 ČD (Czechia)
 CFL (Luxembourg)
 DB (Germany)
 DSB (Denmark)
 NMBS/SNCB (Belgium)
 NS (the Netherlands)
 ÖBB (Austria)
 Renfe (Spain)
 SJ (Sweden)
 SBB/CFF/FFS (Switzerland)
 SNCF (France)
 SŽ (Slovenia)
 Trenitalia (Italy)
 ŽSSK (Slovakia)

Subsidiaries as Eurostar or Thalys aren't signatories even if their mother company has signed the AJC.

The agreement is open to new signatories.

As of 2022, all signatories are European national rail operators. No open-access operators have signed yet.

External links 

 CIT - Agreement concerning Journey Continuation in respect of International Passenger Traffic by Rail (AJC) (50 pages, CIT member login necessary)

References 

International rail transport
Rail transport in Europe
Rail transport terms of service